Hyposmocoma domicolens is a species of moth of the family Cosmopterigidae. It was first described by Arthur Gardiner Butler in 1881. It is endemic to the Hawaiian islands of Maui and possibly Molokai, Lanai and Hawaii. The type locality is Makawao.

External links

domicolens
Endemic moths of Hawaii
Moths described in 1881